Elizabeth Ann Reaser (born July 2, 1975) is an American film, television, and stage actress. Her work includes the films Stay, The Family Stone, Sweet Land, Against the Current, The Twilight Saga, Young Adult, and Ouija: Origin of Evil, and the TV series Saved, Grey's Anatomy, The Ex-List, The Good Wife, True Detective, The Handmaid's Tale, and The Haunting of Hill House.

Early life and education 
Reaser was born in the affluent Detroit suburb of Bloomfield Hills. Her parents are Karen Davidson (née Weidman) and John Reaser. She is the middle of three sisters. In 1995, her mother married billionaire businessman William Davidson.

Reaser attended both the Academy of the Sacred Heart in Bloomfield Hills and Avondale High School in Auburn Hills where she graduated in 1993. After high school, she attended Oakland University for one year, then attended the Juilliard School's Drama Division (1995–1999, Group 28), where she graduated with a Bachelor of Fine Arts degree in 1999.

Career 
Reaser prepared for her role on Saved by spending time in an emergency room, observing the behavior of medical staff. In October 2004, Interview magazine hailed her as one of the "14 To Be" emerging creative women. Her work in the film Sweet Land earned the "Jury Award" at the Newport Beach Film Festival and a nomination for the Independent Spirit Award "Best Female Lead" award. Reaser earned a Primetime Emmy Award nomination for Outstanding Guest Actress in a Drama Series for her recurring guest appearance throughout 2007 and 2008 on the television series Grey's Anatomy.

Reaser is best known for her portrayal of Esme Cullen in the film Twilight, and its follow-ups The Twilight Saga: New Moon in 2009, The Twilight Saga: Eclipse in 2010, and parts one (2011) and two (2012) of The Twilight Saga: Breaking Dawn.

Reaser appeared on the CBS' legal drama, The Good Wife in October 2010.

Reaser appeared in Season 3 of The Handmaid's Tale on Hulu.

Filmography

Film

Television

Theater

Awards and nominations

References

External links 

 

1975 births
Living people
Actresses from Michigan
American film actresses
American stage actresses
American television actresses
Juilliard School alumni
Oakland University alumni
People from Bloomfield, Oakland County, Michigan
20th-century American actresses
21st-century American actresses
American Shakespearean actresses